Novomatveyevka is a rural locality (a settlement) in Samarsky Selsoviet, Rubtsovsky District, Altai Krai, Russia. The population was 76 as of 2013. There is 1 street.

Geography 
Novomatveyevka is located 24 km south of Rubtsovsk (the district's administrative centre) by road. Samarka is the nearest rural locality.

References 

Rural localities in Rubtsovsky District